Ada High School may refer to:

 Ada High School (Ohio), Ada, Ohio
 Ada High School (Oklahoma), Ada, Oklahoma